Kazbek Taysaev (born 12 February 1967, Chikola, Russia) is a Russian political figure and a deputy of the 6th, 7th, and 8th State Dumas.
 
From 1985 to 1987, Taysaev served in the Soviet Armed Forces. From 1986 to 1991, he was a member of the Communist Party of the Soviet Union. After the dissolution of the Soviet Union, Taysaev was one of the initiators of the revival of the Komsomol movement in the Post-Soviet space. From 2002 to 2007, Taysaev worked at the Government of the Moscow Oblast as an assistant to Vladimir Kashin. From 2007 to 2011, he was the deputy of the Parliament of the Republic of North Ossetia–Alania. In 2008-2011, he was the advisor to Stanislav Kochiev. In 2008, he was also appointed secretary of the Central Committee of the Communist Party of the Russian Federation. From 2011 to 2016, he was the deputy of the 6th State Duma. In 2016 and 2021, he was re-elected for the 7th and 8th State Dumas.

References
 

 

1967 births
Living people
Communist Party of the Russian Federation members
21st-century Russian politicians
Eighth convocation members of the State Duma (Russian Federation)
Seventh convocation members of the State Duma (Russian Federation)
Sixth convocation members of the State Duma (Russian Federation)